Leen de Groot (born 16 April 1946) is a retired Dutch cyclist who was active between 1964 and 1969. He won the Ronde van Drenthe and Delta Profronde in 1967 and the Olympia's Tour in 1968.

References

1946 births
Living people
Dutch male cyclists
Sportspeople from Utrecht (city)
Cyclists from Utrecht (province)